Syllis ramosa is a species of polychaete worm in the family Syllidae. It is found in the deep sea where it lives within the tissues of a sponge. It was the first branching polychaete worm to be discovered, with each worm having a single head and multiple anuses.

History
During the period 1872 to 1876, the Royal Navy's HMS Challenger was used in the Challenger expedition to survey and explore the world's oceans. One of the unknown animals dredged from the ocean depths near the Philippines was a species of sponge which was found to contain numerous branching worms inside its cavities. In 1879, one of these worms was formally described by the Scottish marine biologist William Carmichael McIntosh, who named it Syllis ramosa. Branching polychaete worms were previously unknown.

Distribution
Further branching worms have occasionally been found in different locations and have been ascribed to S. ramosa despite subtle differences in morphology; they are hard to examine because of the difficulty of extracting them from the sponge tissue. However a new species of branching worm (Ramisyllis multicaudata) was described in 2012.

Ecology
The heads of the two individual S. ramosa brought to the surface by the Challenger were located in the bases of glass sponges of the class Hexactinellida. The rest of the worms' bodies were in the passages of the sponges. The bodies branched repeatedly so that each worm had a single head and many anuses.

S. ramosa is a "stolonate" worm and has a bizarre life cycle. The terminal portion of a branch is known as a "stolon", and develops an extra head with large eyes and no mouth. The gut in this part of the animal is absorbed, the muscles are rearranged to facilitate swimming and the stolon becomes a storage receptacle for the eggs or sperm. When the breeding period arrives, the stolon becomes detached and swims to the surface of the sea, in a process termed "epitoky". Here the gametes are released and the stolon dies. Meanwhile, the parent worm remains safely in its sponge home and produces more stolons.

References

Syllidae
Animals described in 1879